Taiwan Beer (or ) is a large-market beer brewed by the Taiwan Tobacco and Liquor Corporation (TTL). The brand, an icon of Taiwanese culture, is the best-selling beer in the country.

History

The company today known as TTL had its origins in a government agency established by Taiwan's Japanese rulers in 1901. The Monopoly Bureau of the Taiwan Governor's Office was responsible for all liquor and tobacco products sold in Taiwan as well as opium, salt, and camphor.

In 1922, the Monopoly Bureau began brewing Takasago Beer through the Takasago Malted Beer Company producing light and dark varieties. The price of Takasago Beer varied widely over the course of its manufacture, depending on the availability of imported Japanese beers in Taiwan and on the contingencies of the economy. As World War II reached its conclusion in the 1940s, matches, petroleum, and standard weights and measures also came under the Monopoly Bureau's authority.

After the end of World War II the incoming Chinese Nationalists preserved the monopoly system for alcohol and tobacco. Production of beer was assigned in 1945 to the Taiwan Provincial Monopoly Bureau. The name Taiwan Beer was adopted in 1946. The following year, production of the beer was assigned to the Taiwan Tobacco and Wine Monopoly Bureau.

In the 1960s locally produced  was added to the fermentation process, resulting in the distinctive local flavour for which the beer is known today.

Taiwan entered its modern period of pluralistic democracy in the 1990s. Free trade and open markets became priorities as Taiwan prepared for admission to the World Trade Organization (WTO) in 2002. That year laws went into force that opened Taiwan's market to competing products. On 2002-07-01 the Monopoly Bureau passed into history. Its successor, the Taiwan Tobacco and Liquor Corporation, is a publicly owned company that competes in the marketplace. TTL introduced a new brew, Taiwan Beer Gold Medal, by the end of its first year. Since then, the product line has expanded to include Taiwan Beer Draft (a lager for restaurant sales), two malt beers under the Mine label (Amber and Dark), and four fruit-flavoured beers.

Taiwan Beer remains the island's best-selling beer brand and is one of the most recognised brands in Taiwan's business world.

Beer

Taiwan Beer is an amber lager beer with a distinct taste produced by the addition of locally produced ponlai rice ("Formosa rice" 蓬萊米) during the fermentation process. Like all large-market beers, the original Taiwan Beer brew is filtered and pasteurised. It is served cold and best complements Taiwanese and Japanese cuisine, especially seafood dishes such as sushi and sashimi. Taiwan Beer has won international awards, including the International Monde Selection in 1997 and the Brewing Industry International Awards in 2002. Taiwan Beer is mass-produced at the Taiwan Beer Factory in Wuri District, Taichung City. It is also brewed on-site at the Taiwan Beer Bar in Taipei.

Three lager-style brews bear the label Taiwan Beer. The Original brew is sold in brown bottles with a cream-coloured label and in white cans bearing a blue and green design. The Gold Medal brew, introduced in April 2003, is sold in green bottles and cans that reproduce the white, red, and green label seen on the bottle. Original Taiwan beer is 4.5% and Gold is 5% by volume and are regularly seen in Taiwan's convenience and grocery stores. The newest lager, Taiwan Beer 18 days, bears a signature solid green bottle with no paper label; was sold in cans at a later date. Draft appears most often in bars and restaurants, where it is available on tap or from refrigerators. The brew, designed to be sold fresh, is less often seen in stores due to its expiration just 18 days after production. In 2013 more stores began to stock the brew as ads and labels trumpeted its early expiration date.

Taiwan Beer began selling a malt brew in 2008 bearing the Mine label. Brisk sales of Mine, an amber, led to the introduction of Mine Dark two years later. Mine malts are 5% alcohol by volume. Both malts are regularly stocked in Taiwan convenience stores. Bottles wear paper labels whose designs are repeated on cans. Mine sales have reportedly fallen since the launch of the new summer fruit beer brews.

In 2012 Taiwan Beer introduced two new brews with tropical fruit flavours added: mango and pineapple. With 2.8% alcohol content and sweeter flavour, these proved popular with summer drinkers. Two new flavours, grape and orange, were introduced to the line in 2013. The fruit-enhanced brews, like all Taiwan Beer brews, are made available in bottles or cans.

With the increasing popularity of wheat beer such as Kronenbourg Blanc and Hoegaarden in Taiwan, Taiwan Beer launched a wheat beer of their own, Taiwan Weissbier Draft, in late 2013. It is sold in 600ml bottles and 330ml cans in most convenience stores.

Culture
The iconic status of the Taiwan Beer brand in Taiwanese society is reinforced by TTL marketing strategies. Ads feature celebrity endorsements by popular Taiwanese figures such as A-Mei. A basketball team named Taiwan Beer, popularly nicknamed 'The Brew Crew,' is sponsored by the company. The Taiwan Beer Bar and Beer Garden is a popular restaurant/brewery in Taipei. Restaurants and nightspots are also proliferating at the Taiwan Beer Factory in Wuri District, Taichung City. The Factory, near the Wujih station of the Taiwan High Speed Rail, is the site of an annual Taiwan Beer Festival (台灣啤酒節, Táiwān Píjiǔjié) held every summer.

Competition
Taiwan Beer leads its namesake market. Its main large-market competitor is Long Chuan, owned by the Taiwan Tsing Beer Corporation and brewed in Kaohsiung City. Long Chuan launched a range of fruit beers in 2012.

Microbrews, handcrafted beers and other limited-distribution beers represent a separate category. Leading Taiwan artisan beers include Three Giants Brewing Company (巨人啤酒) with a range of Lagers, Pale Ales, IPA's, Wheat Beer and Dark Lager,  Redpoint Brewing, which produced the island's first IPA called 台PA, Formosa Bird Beer and Lychee Beer (both by North Taiwan Brewing) along with the house brews served in two locally owned restaurant chains, Jolly Brewery and Restaurant (operated by Great Reliance Food & Beverage) and Le ble d'or.

References

Bibliography
Lin, Jackie. "Beer fight is about politics: TTL." Taipei Times, 2004-07-02.
"2008 Taiwan Beer Festival." Taipei Times, 2008-08-01.

External links

Taiwan Tobacco and Liquor Corporation (TTL) - Official Site
Taiwan Beer - Ads and Features (YouTube)
Review: Taiwan Beer Bar. Taiwan Fun magazine, 2005-08. 

Beer in Taiwan
Taiwanese brands